The 2002–03 season was Sport Lisboa e Benfica's 99th season in existence and the club's 69th consecutive season in the top flight of Portuguese football. During the season, which lasted from 1 July 2002 to 30 June 2003, Benfica competed in the Primeira Liga and the Taça de Portugal.

Going into a second year without UEFA competitions, qualifying for Europe was one of the club's top priorities; to improve its competitiveness, Benfica signed some of the best domestic players, Ricardo Rocha and Petit, but also brought back former players, like Hélder and Nuno Gomes. Jesualdo Ferreira remained as manager for his first full season on the club.

Benfica's season started with four consecutive victories, to lead the league. In late September, they experienced their first loss and went on a win-less spree that saw them drop to fifth. In November, Benfica won again, but the results remained erratic and after a 7–0 trashing of Paços de Ferreira, they lost to Varzim. A few days later, in the Portuguese Cup, a home loss against Gondomar cost Ferreira his job. Fernando Chalana replaced him for one match, before the appointment of José Antonio Camacho.

With the Spaniard in charge, Benfica regained second place and slowly opened a gap over Sporting, eventually finishing with 75 points, qualifying for the 2003–04 UEFA Champions League. Despite this, Camacho was unable to close the distance to Porto, who finished 11 points ahead. The season was also the last that Benfica played in the original Estádio da Luz, before a new version was built ahead of UEFA Euro 2004. Their final game was on 22 March 2003, with the remaining games being played in the  Estádio Nacional in Oeiras.

Season summary

Pre-season

Although he only guided the team to fourth place in the previous campaign, Jesualdo Ferreira remained in charge of the team, with overwhelming support from inside the club, especially from former Director of Football Gaspar Ramos and former President Manuel Dámasio, who said he was "the best solution to lead Benfica". In the transfer season, Maniche and Robert Enke left the club as their contracts expired; the former joined Porto, the latter, Barcelona. Marco Caneira and Edgaras Jankauskas also left, as Benfica did not get their loan deals renewed; with Jankauskas immediately moving to Porto. Benfica replaced Jankauskas with Nuno Gomes on a free transfer after the collapse of Fiorentina. Gomes scored 76 goals in his first spell at Benfica; expectations were high, with crowds gathering to see him in training sessions. He joined a depleted attack, which only had the new signing from Porto Miklós Fehér as option, as both Mantorras and Tomo Šokota were injured. The back four was also strengthened, with Benfica bringing back Hélder after six seasons abroad and adding Ricardo Rocha, a young defender from Braga.

The pre-season began on 9 July with a week of training before the club travelled to Switzerland on the 13th, where they played their first two games of the pre-season, against Étoile Carouge and Auxerre. After a game in Palermo with Inter Milan on 21 July, Benfica returned to Portugal the next day, meeting up with Sporting in the Superbola Trophy on the 28th. With three more matches in early August, including one in the Guadiana Trophy, Benfica closed its season preparation with a match against European champions Real Madrid on 17 August, a week before the first official game.<ref>{{cite news|title=Benfica-Real Madrid, 2-3 (Zahovic 6{{}}, Argel 45, Miñambres 61)|url=http://www.record.xl.pt/futebol/futebol-nacional/liga-nos/benfica/detalhe/benfica-real-madrid-2-3-zahovic-6-argel-45-figo-11-miambres-61-portillo-80.html|work=Record|date=17 August 2002|access-date=2 September 2015|language=Portuguese}}</ref>

August–October
Benfica started the 2002–03 Primeira Liga campaign at home against Marítimo, scoring twice in the first half, leading to a 3–0 win. The following Saturday, they played Beira-Mar away and won 2–0 after an early lead; according to Manuel Queiroz of Record, despite "dominating in the first half, [Benfica] suffered to retain the lead in the second, with the two nil only arriving right near the end". The club ended the month sharing first place with two other teams, but with a higher goal average than them.

The team began September with a 3–2 away win against Moreirense; Fehér had a decisive influence, earning a penalty and scoring the winner in the 78th minute. Benfica won their fourth consecutive game on 21 September, with a 3–1 win at home against União de Leiria. In the second half, Simão scored his fourth and fifth league goals, unlocking the game that was tied 1–1 at half-time. They ended September with a visit to Estádio da Madeira to play Nacional. The game ended with a 0–1 loss; according to José Ribeiro writing for Record, "after two warnings in the previous two games, the inevitable happened. With known defensive weaknesses, Benfica was winning because of their players intelligence (Zahovič and Petit) and talent (Simão). Only yesterday, none of that worked, given that Peseiro read the game very well and found Benfica's problems ... ".

Benfica hosted Vitória Setúbal on 5 October, dropping two points in a 1–1 draw, due to a "childish error, or better yet, a lack of sharpness of the back-four", in the words of Ricardo Tavares from Record. On 20 October, Benfica met Porto in Estádio das Antas for the Clássico. It was an intense match, with 3 ejections and 73 fouls. Porto won 2–1 because to António Tadeira, they "reacted better to playing outnumbered, while Benfica lost their focus when Paulo Costa sent off Éder and then Miguel". Six days later, for the final game of the month, Benfica played Académica at home. The final score of 1–1 was the best possible, because Académica scored the first goal in the 86th minute, giving Benfica only a few minutes to level the game, which Carlitos did in the 90th minute. Benfica ended the month in fifth place, having won only two of nine possible points.

November–February
At the beginning of November, Benfica headed to the Azores to play Santa Clara. They won 2–1 due to a double from Simão. A week later, the team played Paços de Ferreira in the Estádio da Luz. The game ended with a 7–0 win for Benfica; Antonio Tadeia writing for Record said the win "showed that Benfica it is alive and well in the league, even without two internationals, Simão and Petit". On 16 November, Benfica played Varzim away, resulting in a 1–2 loss; Rui Dias wrote for Record that, Varzim "adjusted better to the windstorm night and to the soaking wet field ... taking the initiative in the search for the three points".

On 24 November, Benfica started the 2002–03 Taça de Portugal by playing Gondomar at home for the fourth round. A 10th-minute goal from Cilio knocked Benfica out of the competition. Tinoco de Faria, the club vice-president, called the defeat "unacceptable"; Jesualdo Ferreira was relieved of his duties the day after. Benfica appointed Fernando Chalana as caretaker until they could agree terms with José Antonio Camacho. On the day Camacho arrived to sign with Benfica, Chalana led the team against Braga at home. He moved Miguel to right-back and started Hélder instead of João Manuel Pinto; Benfica defeated the visitors by 3–0.

In the opening match of December, Benfica played Gil Vicente at home after rescheduling the game from 29 November to 4 December, because of an imminent players strike during the holidays. They won that match 3–1 with two first-half goals; António Varela wrote that the unpredictability of Simão "unbalanced the opponent and the game"; Benfica climbed to second place before a match against Sporting. On 7 December, Benfica played their last game in the 46-year-old Estádio de Alvalade against city rivals Sporting in the Derby de Lisboa. The game ended with a 2–0 win for Benfica, who controlled the game from the beginning; as José Manuel Delgado wrote, " ... the advantage of the visitors starting in the clear superiority of Tiago and Petit in the direct contend with Paulo Bento and Rui Bento, while Zahovic descended to guide the team ... ". A week later, the team played Belenenses at home. Simão scored the sole goal of the game in the 55th minute, helping Camacho to a third consecutive win. During the last game of the month, Benfica played Boavista away, drawing 0–0; José Manuel Delgado at Record criticized the players of both teams for "showing little inspiration and inability to break away from the tight tactical requirements of the game".

Early in January 2003, Benfica announced the signing of Brazilian midfielder Geovanni, on a loan deal from Barcelona until the end of the season. On 11 January, the team played Vitória Guimarães away. The 1–1 draw after 90 minutes was a consequence of the constant interruptions for a large number of fouls signalled by the referee. In the stands, the problematic behaviour of the Benfica supporters group No Name Boys caused the governing body of the Portuguese league to punish both clubs by closing their stadiums for one game each. On the following Sunday, Benfica visited the Estádio dos Barreiros for a game against Marítimo, which Benfica won 2–1 after an individual effort from Nuno Gomes in the 74th minute. It was the first win there since 1994–95. After selecting the Estádio Municipal Dr. Alves Vieira in Torres Novas to replace Estádio da Luz, Benfica hosted Beira-Mar on 26 January, winning 1–0 with a goal from Geovanni. Three days later, the team played the second friendly of the month after a 1–1 draw against Ajax a week before. During the game, intended to bring people to Da Luz, Benfica lost 0–1 to Barcelona.

On 1 February, Benfica played Moreirense at home, drawing 1–1; Rui Dias wrote that the team's overconfidence was the main reason for the draw because they were "unsettled by the lack of space ... they allowed the clock to run, certain a goal would arrive, soon or later". On 8 February, Benfica visited the Estádio Municipal da Marinha Grande to play União de Leiria. The final score, 3–0 to Benfica, was the biggest in the Camacho era; António Tadeia, writing for Record, complimented the team for the "more pleasing performance, after the very poor display against Moreirense". The following Sunday, Benfica played Nacional at home. According to Rui Dias' match analysis in Record, the team strong first half " .. left the feeling that two goals were not enough in such a display of power ... ", allowing them to manage the game in the second half, ensuring a 2–0 win and reducing the distance to Porto to 10 points. Benfica won their third consecutive match on 22 February; a 6–2 away win against Vitória Setúbal. The opponents took an early lead in the 18th minute when Pascal scored a goal, and doubled their advantage five minutes later; however, in a strong second half, Benfica overturned the game. Simão scored a hat-trick, aided by Tiago and Tomo Šokota, who also scored goals.

March–June
On 4 March, Benfica played Porto on the last Clássico to be held at the Estádio da Luz. Porto won 1–0 through Deco's goal, in a match that Manuel Queiroz at Record defined as " ... ending the last doubts of who is the future champion and who is the best team in the league, defeating Camacho's Benfica for the first time ... " Benfica rebounded with an away win against Académica on 15 March, beating them 4–1 in the Municipal José Bento Pessoa in Figueira da Foz. A week later, Benfica had its last game on the old Estádio da Luz before the 49-year-old stadium's demolition, playing against Santa Clara. The match ended in a 1–0 win for Benfica, but António Tadeia described the performance as "colourless".

On 5 April, April Benfica played at Estádio da Mata Real against Paços de Ferreira. With three goals in the first half-hour, Benfica secured the lead until the end to gain three points in a 3–1 win. With the league on international break, Benfica played two friendlies abroad; one against Luxembourg's F91 Dudelange and another against Paris Saint-Germain. They resumed their league campaign on 21 April, hosting home games at the Estádio Nacional in Oeiras where they met Varzim. Benfica won 2–1; and according to António Magalhães writing for Record'', they "wasted a excessive number of opportunities to score". On the following Saturday, Benfica played away to Braga at the Estádio Primeiro de Maio. By winning 3–1, they opened an 11-point gap above third-place Sporting. 

On 3 May, Benfica met Sporting for the second Derby de Lisboa of the season. In the words of António Tadeia, the visitors took on an approach of "ignoring the midfield ... and abusing of the long ball", inflicting a 1–2 loss upon Benfica. A week later, Benfica defeated Belenenses in Restelo, securing the second place in the league with a 4–2 victory and the associated berth to the third qualifying round of the 2003–04 UEFA Champions League. On 18 May, Benfica played Boavista at home. Camacho changed several players of the starting eleven, but the match ended in a 1–1 draw. Benfica closed the month with a 2–0 away win against Adelino Ribeiro Novo; Rui Dias wrote that Benfica showed "professionalism, despite having nothing to fight for".

Benfica played their last game of the season on 1 June at home against Vitória Guimarães, winning 4–0; Féher scored a hat-trick. Benfica finished in second place after the 34-game season with 23 wins, six draws and five losses for a total of 75 points. They scored 74 goals, the most in the league, and conceded 27, the second-lowest league-wide. Simão was the joint highest scorer in the Primeira Liga, with 18 goals, equal to Beira-Mar's Faye Fary; the latter took the Bola de Prata award due to having played fewer games.

Competitions

Overall record

Primeira Liga

League table

Results by round

Matches

Taça de Portugal

Friendlies

Player statistics
The squad for the season consisted of the players listed in the tables below, as well as managers Jesualdo Ferreira and José António Camacho. Ljubinko Drulović took over the captaincy from Robert Enke.

|}

Transfers

In

In by loan

Out

Out by loan

References

Bibliography
 

S.L. Benfica seasons
Benfica